The 1950 Pau Grand Prix was a non-championship Formula One motor race held on 10 April 1950 at the Pau circuit, in Pau, Pyrénées-Atlantiques, France. It was the second race of the 1950 Formula One season, and was conducted on the same day as the 1950 Richmond Trophy. The 110-lap race was won by Maserati driver Juan Manuel Fangio after starting from pole position. Luigi Villoresi finished second in a Ferrari, and Louis Rosier third in a Talbot-Lago.

Classification

Race

References

Race results are taken from:

Pau Grand Prix
Pau
1950 in French motorsport